Filipe Semedo Rodrigues (born 22 January 2000) is a Portuguese professional footballer who plays as a goalkeeper.

Football career
He made his Taça da Liga debut for Vilafranquense on 28 July 2019 in a game against Casa Pia.

References

External links

2000 births
Living people
Sportspeople from Cascais
Portuguese footballers
Association football goalkeepers
U.D. Vilafranquense players
U.D. Leiria players
Campeonato de Portugal (league) players